is a female wrestler from Japan.

External links
 bio on fila-wrestling.com

Living people
1983 births
Japanese female sport wrestlers
World Wrestling Championships medalists
Asian Wrestling Championships medalists
21st-century Japanese women